Bijni Assembly constituency is one of the 126 state legislative assembly constituencies in Assam state in North Eastern India. It is also one of the 10 state legislative assembly constituencies included in the Kokrajhar Lok Sabha constituency.

Town Details

Following are details on Bijni Assembly constituency:

Country: India.
 State: Assam.
 District: Chirang district .
 Lok Sabha Constituency: Kokrajhar Lok Sabha/Parliamentary constituency.
 Assembly Categorisation: Rural.
 Literacy Level: 89.37%.
 Eligible Electors as per 2021 General Elections: 1,34,595 Eligible Electors. Male Electors: 70,044. Female Electors: 64,551 .
 Geographic Co-Ordinates: 26°42'03.6"N 90°46'08.0"E..
 Total Area Covered:  466 square kilometres.
 Area Includes:  Bijni thana [excluding the villages specified in item (14) of the Appendix] in Kokrajhar sub-division, Chirang district of Assam.
 Inter State Border : Chirang.
 Number Of Polling Stations: Year 2011-189,Year 2016-197,Year 2021-33.

Members of Legislative Assembly 

Following is the list of past members representing Bijni Assembly constituency in Assam Legislature.

Election results

2021 results

2016 result

See also
 Chirang district
 Bijni
 List of constituencies of Assam Legislative Assembly

References

External links 
 

Assembly constituencies of Assam
Chirang district